Reverend Father Raoul Desribes (born in 1856, died in 1940) was a French Jesuit archaeologist notable for his work on prehistory in Lebanon, particularly the archaeological site of Minet Dalieh at Ras Beirut. He found two paleolithic bone harpoons.

References

External links
 Biography (in French) Lebanese Museum of Prehistory, Saint Joseph University Website

20th-century French Jesuits
19th-century French Jesuits
French Roman Catholic missionaries
French archaeologists
1856 births
1940 deaths
Jesuit scientists
Jesuit missionaries
Roman Catholic missionaries in Lebanon
French expatriates in Lebanon